is a Japanese manga artist and illustrator from Fukui Prefecture. She is best known for her work on the Dept. Heaven series of games and her yonkoma manga GA Geijutsuka Art Design Class and Shoulder-a-Coffin Kuro.

Works

Manga
 GA Geijutsuka Art Design Class
 Shoulder-a-Coffin Kuro

Games
 Dept. Heaven series
 Yggdra Union: We'll Never Fight Alone
 Yggdra Unison
 Gungnir
 Knights in the Nightmare

References

External links
 Houbunsha author overview (Japanese)
 

Japanese illustrators
Living people
Manga artists from Fukui Prefecture
Year of birth missing (living people)